Zhijiang Dong Autonomous County, usually referred to as Zhijiang County is an autonomous county of the Dong people in Hunan Province, China. It is under the administration of Huaihua prefecture-level city.

Zhijiang is located on the west central margin of Hunan Province, immediately adjacent to the east border of Guizhou Province. It borders Bijiang and Wanshan Districts of Tongren, Guizhou to the northwest, Mayang County to the north, Hecheng District of Huaihua and Zhongfang County to the east, Hongjiang City and Huitong County to the southeast, Tianzhu County of Guizhou to the southwest, Xinhuang County to the west. The county has nine towns and nine townships under its jurisdiction, the county seat is Zhijiang Town.

Zhijiang is the place that the first major Japanese surrender ceremony in China took place on August 21, 1945.  The Japanese Vice General Secretary Takeo Imai signed the surrounding treaty, marking the end of the Second Sino-Japanese War.

Geography and climate

Zhijiang County is situated in western Hunan at the eastern end of the Yunnan-Guizhou Plateau, amongst the southern end of the Xuefeng and Wuling Mountains. It borders Xinhuang Dong Autonomous County and Guizhou's Wanshan District and Tianzhu County to the west, Huitong County and Hongjiang Administrative District to the south, Zhongfang County and Hecheng District to the east, and Mayang Miao Autonomous County to the north.

Winters are mild and brief, beginning somewhat dry and turning wet and gloomy as the season progresses. Spring is very rainy, especially in May, which is the wettest month. Summer is hot and humid (but tempered compared to much of the province), with moderate levels of rain, and generous sunshine; on average, July and August are the only two months where the area receives more than half of possible sunshine. Autumn is the driest season. From March to June, on average, more than half of the days each month receive some precipitation. With monthly percent possible sunshine ranging from 15% in February to 56% in August, the county receives 1,482 hours of sunshine annually.

References
www.xzqh.org

External links

 
County-level divisions of Hunan
Huaihua
Kam autonomous counties